Ségolène Girard (born 18 November 1995) is a Swiss volleyball player. She is a member of the Women's National Team.
She participated at the 2016 Montreux Volley Masters. 
She plays for Vitéos Neuchatel.

References

External links 

 FIVB Profile
 CEV profile
http://www.fivb.org/vis_web/volley/MTRX2016/MTRX2016_p3-011.pdf

1995 births
Living people
Swiss women's volleyball players
Place of birth missing (living people)